|}

The Paddy Power Cheltenham Countdown Podcast  is a Premier Handicap National Hunt steeplechase in Great Britain which is open to horses aged five years or older. It is run on the New Course at Cheltenham over a distance of about 2 miles and 4½ furlongs (2 miles 4 furlongs and 127 yards, or 4,139 metres) and during the race there are 17 fences to be jumped. It is a handicap race, and is scheduled to take place each year in late January. Prior to 2014 it was run as the Murphy Group Chase and from 2014 to 2016 it was sponsored by freebets.com  It is currently sponsored by the Paddy Power bookmaking company.

The race was first run in 1993 and was awarded Listed status in 2002, when it was known as the Ladbroke Trophy Chase.  It was awarded Grade 3 status in 2005 and re-classified as a Premier Handicap in 2023.

Winners

See also
 Horse racing in Great Britain
 List of British National Hunt races

References

Racing Post:

Cheltenham Racecourse
National Hunt chases
National Hunt races in Great Britain
1993 establishments in England
Recurring sporting events established in 1993